Connie Deanovich (born 1960) is an American poet.

She lived in Chicago. She now lives in Madison, Wisconsin.

Her work appeared in Bomb, Grand Street, New American Writing, Parnassus, See, Sulfur.

Awards
 1997 Whiting Award
 GE Award for Younger Writers.

Works
"from THE SPOTTED MOON"; "THE FRONTIER AND THE BACH FRONTIER", Mad Poetry
"Formerly Communist Love Sonnet", Poetry Foundation
"Little Is Known About the Mantella Expectata"; "Red, Gray, Black, and White Scarf"; " The 100 Miguels", David Trinidad Edition

Anthologies

References

External links
"Connie Deanovich", Here Comes Everybody, July 19, 2005
Profile at The Whiting Foundation

Living people
1960 births
American women poets
Writers from Chicago
Writers from Madison, Wisconsin
21st-century American poets
21st-century American women writers